Goodwill to All Men was the tenth episode of the third series of the British television series, Upstairs, Downstairs. The episode is set during Christmas 1913. It introduces Richard's ward Georgina Worsley (Lesley-Anne Down) and housemaid Daisy (Jacqueline Tong), both of whom remain central characters until the series' final episode.

Cast
Regular cast
 Georgina (Lesley-Anne Down)	 
 Daisy Peel (Jacqueline Tong)

Guest cast
 Lady Southwold (Cathleen Nesbitt)
 Mrs. Peel (Jennifer McEvoy) 
 Bill (Dan Gillan)

Plot
Georgina Worsley (born 28 November 1895) arrives to live at Eaton Place in 1913. She is the step-daughter of Lady Marjorie's brother Hugo Talbot-Carey (the new Earl of Southwold). His new wife is the widow Marion Worsley, and mother of Georgina by her previous marriage. Georgina's natural father died in a hunting accident when she was six years old.  Her mother and step-father die along with Lady Marjorie in the sinking of the RMS Titanic in 1912. After that she moves into 165 Eaton Place right before Christmas in December 1913. Georgina is deeply moved by  Daisy Peel's (the new under house parlour maid) history of her family. Georgina goes with Daisy and a lot of presents to Daisy's family in Hoxton. But Daisy's father is dead and her mother is now married to a drunk and violent alcoholic named Bill. Daisy sees that her mother is ill and is run out of the house by Bill’s violent behaviour.

References 

Upstairs, Downstairs (series 3) episodes
1973 British television episodes
Fiction set in 1913